Biochemical pharmacology can be:

Pharmacology, the branch of medicine and biology concerned with the study of drug action
Biochemical Pharmacology (journal), a peer-reviewed medical journal published by Elsevier